is a Japanese voice actress and singer from Hiroshima, generally performing for adult games. She debuted in 2005 as a voice actress and started her singing career in 2006. Tamiyasu has been the host of three Internet radio shows, and has been a guest on a fourth. She is also known under the name Tomoe Tamiya, such as when she voiced Rin Natsume from Key's visual novel Little Busters!. She also sang songs on an image vocal album released for Little Busters! for Rin. She attended Anime Expo in 2012 with the industry guest MangaGamer. She married voice actor Keisuke Nakamura in 2015.

Since December 2018, Tamiyasu is also active as a virtual YouTuber under the name .

Filmography
2005
 Hitozuma Swapping Seikatsu
 Hotaru no Kigi
 I-ki-na-ri Iinazuke: Hime-sama no Okoshire
 Mareido: Chōkyō no Kan
 Mugen Rinkan
 Ohime-sama wa Tokkun Chū!!2: Uketsugareshi Sei Naru Majutsu
 Osananajimi no Nukumori
 Pa-pi-ko-n: Futago no Musume wa Dōkyūsei
 Project Sex

2006
 >>Fami! Kyō no Menu wa Lesson C
 Ano Machi no Koi no Uta
 AV King
 Chicchai Medio-san
 Chokotto Vampire
 Cloth × Close: Boku ga Kiin!?
 CooL!! Kyō Musume Jun Reika
 Cross Fire
 Double Solid
 Elder Vice
 Figyū @ Mate
 Jokyōshi Yūko
 Kansen
 Kunoichi Saya
 Mamotte Agechū! Karaoke-hen "Masami"
 Mamoote Agechū! Shūshoku Party-hen Rankōshi Chū zo!
 Moeru Downhill Night 2
 Onegai Goshushin-sama!
 Onidō Fūgamiki
 Oshiete Miko Sensei
 Rabu + Rabi
 Reijō Kurabu: Dajoku no Ryoshūtachi
 Seikishi Sanranki
 Snow: Plus Edition

2007
 Ane wa Bikini Model
 Arcus X: Itsuwari no Rinjin, Inkō e no Shōtaijō
 Arcus X: Seigen no Kaishōsha, Shinobiyoru Inmu
 Arcus X: Seigen Sensō, Ingoku no Kiseki
 Ayatsuri Haramase Dream Note
 Boku ga Koshita Ojō-sama
 Chikan Senyō Sharyō: Kutsujoku no Chikan Densha
 Dain Miko
 Fūrinkan-san: Kono Mi Ikutabi Kegasare Yōto mo
 Hime Kishi Angelica: Anatatte Hontō ni Saitei no Kuzu da wa!
 Jōtai Saishū: Onna no Mata ni Hisomu Chō
 Inbaku Kankin Chōkyō
 Inran Roshutsu Chōkyō
 Inshoku Chikan Densha
 Kankeizu
 Kansen 2: Inzai Toshi
 Kyun Kyun Dō: Otona no Tame no Oisha-san Gokko
 Little Busters! as Rin Natsume, Riki Naoe, and Sasami Sasasegawa
 Love kiss! Anchor
 Mahō Shōjo Nayuta
 Megami Taisen
 Mimi × Mimi: Hatsujō Chūiho
 Moeru Downhill Night Blaze
 Ōzoku
 Ore no Megami-sama!
 Osananajimi wa Bed Yakuza!
 Rururu to Sasara no Sensei Oshiete: Boku wa Onna no Obōcchama
 Shifuki Mermaid
 Sorudianji Mahō Kurabu
 Trouble Succubus 'Darling, Kona mo Ippaai Ecchi Shichao'''
 Zoku Hitō Meguri2008
 5 as Shino Harunire
 Hoshiuta as Nanano Suoh
 Little Busters! Ecstasy as Rin Natsume, Riki Naoe, and Sasami Sasasegawa

2009
 Hoshiuta: Starlight Serenade as Nanano Suoh
 Hime to Boin as Maple-hime
 W.L.O. Sekai Ren'ai Kikou as Ina

2010
 Deardrops as Yayoi Ooba
 Iro ni Ide ni Keri Waga Koi wa as Rio Tenjo
 In Search of the Lost Future as Nagisa Hanamiya

2011
 Tsugou no Yoi Sexfriend? as Kotori
 The Fruit of Grisaia as Makina Irisu

2015
 The Eden of Grisaia as Makina Irisu
 Charlotte as Mishima

2020
 Overflow as Ayane Shirakawa

Game theme songs
 "Famifami", opening theme of >>Fami! Kyō no Menu wa Lesson C "Kirakira × Keeper", opening theme of Osōji Sentai Clean Keeper "Love Love Trouble", opening theme of Trouble Succubus 'Darling, Kona mo Ippaai Ecchi Shichao' "Meido-san Super Live!", opening theme of Onegai Goshushin-sama! "MySweetHome", opening theme of SweetHome "Oyome-san ga Megami-sama", opening theme of Ore no Megami-sama! "Sensei Oshiete", opening theme of Rururu to Sasara no Sensei Oshiete: Boku wa Onna no Obōcchama''
 "Dakko Shite Gyu! ~Nanji Tonari no Yome wo Aise~" Opening theme of Dakko Shite Gyu! -Ore no Yome wa Dakimakura-
 "Happy my home", opening of "Happy wedding in livingroom"

References

External links 
  
 

Year of birth missing (living people)
Living people
Voice actresses from Hiroshima
Japanese video game actresses
Japanese voice actresses
Japanese women singers
Musicians from Hiroshima Prefecture
Japanese YouTubers
VTubers